Jane Wants a Boyfriend is a 2015 American romantic comedy film directed by William C. Sullivan. The film had its world premiere on June 6, 2015 at the Greenwich International Film Festival and stars Louisa Krause and Eliza Dushku. The plot revolves around Jane, a woman with Asperger's syndrome who is searching for a boyfriend with the help of her oldest sister, Bianca. Worldwide film rights were purchased by FilmBuff in February 2016 and Jane Wants a Boyfriend was released on March 25, 2016.

Synopsis 
Jane is a young woman with Asperger's syndrome who is living with her parents in Queens, New York. Bianca is her extremely protective older sister who is now moving in with her fiancé, Rob, in Brooklyn. Jane's parents are now moving to New Jersey and they want Jane to move in with Bianca. Bianca and Rob are not sure once they are ready for that kind of responsibility though, and Jane decides she wants her first boyfriend. This causes some strife to the point where it chafes at Jane's growing desire for independence despite ambient noise creeping into her attention. Eventually, this leads to Bianca trying to dissuade one of her friends, Jack, from dating Jane, as she views him as too unreliable for her sister.

Cast 
 Louisa Krause as Jane, a wardrobe worker whose Asperger's syndrome causes background sounds to overload her senses
 Eliza Dushku as Bianca, Jane's older sister, whose worrying manifests as a controlling streak
 Gabriel Ebert as Jack, a guy who, despite being known as immature, does secret research on autism spectrum disorders
 Amir Arison as Rob
 Anisha Nagarajan as Cynthia
 Polly Draper as Mom
 Gregg Edelman as Dad
 Jon Bass as Steve
 Nick Stevenson as Director
 Greg Keller as Paul
 Franco Gonzalez as Jose

Reception 
On Rotten Tomatoes, the film has an approval rating of 38% based on 8 reviews.

References

External links
 
 
 

2015 films
2010s English-language films
2015 romantic comedy-drama films
American romantic comedy-drama films
Films about autism
Films about sisters
Films set in Brooklyn
Films set in Queens, New York
Orion Pictures films
2010s American films